Danny James Lloyd-McGoldrick (born 3 December 1991) is an English professional footballer who plays as a midfielder for League Two side Rochdale.

After beginning his career with Southport, he played for Colwyn Bay, Lincoln City, Tamworth and AFC Fylde. In 2016, he joined Stockport County and enjoyed a prolific season in the National League North. His form attracted interest from several Football League clubs and he signed for Peterborough United, making his professional debut in August 2017, before moving to Salford City.

Career

Non-league
Born in Liverpool, Lloyd began his career with Southport, progressing through the club's youth ranks before being handed his senior debut on 8 September 2009 in a 4–2 victory over Stafford Rangers. He later spent time on loan with Chorley and Skelmersdale United.

He was released by Southport at the end of the 2010–11 season and joined Colwyn Bay. He moved to Lincoln City in January 2012, scoring three times in twelve appearances, but was unable to agree an extension to his contract with manager David Holdsworth at the end of the season and subsequently rejoined Colwyn Bay. His contract with Colwyn included a clause that he could cancel his stay at any time if he received an offer from a Conference Premier side. This clause was activated in January 2013 when Lloyd signed for Tamworth where he played until July 2013.

Following his release from Tamworth, Lloyd signed for AFC Fylde, helping the club gain promotion to the Conference North via the play-offs in his first season after finishing the season as the club's joint top goalscorer. He remained with Fylde for two further seasons before leaving in 2016 after becoming frustrated with his lack of appearances. Lloyd later stated that he became disillusioned with football after leaving Fylde and came close to retiring.

Peterborough United
At the end of the 2016–17 season, following the expiration of his Stockport contract, Lloyd signed for League One side Peterborough United on a three-year contract. After joining the club, Lloyd left his job as a business development manager for waste management company Biffa where he sold bins. He made his professional debut for the club on the opening day of the 2017–18 season as a substitute in place of Marcus Maddison during a 2–1 victory over Plymouth Argyle.

He scored his first goal for the club in an EFL Cup match against Northampton Town on 3 October 2017. He scored his first league goal one month later in a 2–2 draw with AFC Wimbledon and, in the club's following match, he scored a hat-trick in a 5–0 victory over Tranmere Rovers in the FA Cup. However, after struggling to establish himself in the first-team, Lloyd was placed on the transfer list after talks were held between his agent and the club.

Salford City
In July 2018, he joined National League side Salford City on a three-year deal. He made his debut in the opening match of the 2018–19 season on 4 August as Salford drew 1–1 at home to Leyton Orient. He scored his first goal for the club on 27 August when he scored a penalty in a 3–1 victory against Barrow. On 1 September, he was sent off for two bookable offences in the first half of a 0–0 draw with Dagenham & Redbridge.  During the season he played 35 times for the club (including five appearances in cup games), scoring three times. On 7 September 2019, he scored what would be his final goals for Salford when he bagged a brace against Morecambe.

In January 2020 he rejoined former club Stockport County on loan until the end of the season. He made his second début for the club in a 2–0 defeat to Hartlepool United on 25 January. He scored one goal in his second spell, scoring the opening goal of a 1–1 with Woking on 22 February.

Ahead of the 2020–21 season it was announced that he had left Salford City by mutual consent.

Tranmere Rovers
On 10 November 2020, Lloyd joined League Two side Tranmere Rovers on a short-term contract. He made his debut on 11 November 2020 in an EFL Trophy tie against Wigan Athletic. His first goal followed in the same competition in a 2-1 win over Manchester City U21s on 8 December 2020.

Gillingham
On 6 July 2021, Lloyd joined League One side Gillingham, having rejected an offer to remain at Tranmere. Lloyd was released after one season at the club following their relegation to League Two.

Rochdale

On 9 December 2022, he signed a one-month contract with League Two side Rochdale. On 9 January 2023 his contracted was extended until the end of the season.

Career statistics

Honours
Tranmere Rovers
EFL Trophy runner-up: 2020–21

References

External links

1991 births
Living people
Footballers from Liverpool
English footballers
Association football midfielders
Southport F.C. players
Colwyn Bay F.C. players
Lincoln City F.C. players
Tamworth F.C. players
AFC Fylde players
Stockport County F.C. players
Chorley F.C. players
Skelmersdale United F.C. players
Salford City F.C. players
Tranmere Rovers F.C. players
Gillingham F.C. players
Rochdale A.F.C. players
English Football League players
National League (English football) players
Northern Premier League players